Héctor C. Boza Aizcorbe (12 December 1888 – 14 July 1974) was a Peruvian engineer and politician. He was minister of Public Works and Development (1933–1935; 1936; and 1937–1939), senator for Ica (1945–1948); First Vice President of Peru (1950–1956); senator for Lima (1950–1956); and President of the Senate (1950–1951 and 1954–1956).

Biography 

He was the born to lawyer Benjamin Boza Filiberto (who served as a Minister of State, Senator and Mayor of Lima) and Mercedes Aizcorbe. He studied at the school founded by José Granda Esquivel and at the Lima Institute. Then he began his higher studies at the National School of Engineers (currently UNI).

In 1907, he traveled to the United States to continue his professional training. He graduated with a Bachelor of Science from Rolla Missouri School of Mines (1911); In addition to that, he studied Civil Engineering at the University of Illinois and finally received a degree in mining engineering from the University of Wisconsin (1916). He specialized in mining and metallurgy and began working in companies in the United States and Canada.

Returning to Peru, he worked in various mining companies. He was a promoter of urbanization in the country. During the second government of Óscar R. Benavides (1933–1939), he was thrice appointed Minister of Public Works and Development. His work as a minister primarily focused on road construction.

In 1945, he was elected senator from Ica. In 1946 he joined the first Peruvian delegation sent to the UN. The 1948 coup d'état resulted in the failure to complete his parliamentary term.

In the 1950 elections, he stood for the first vice president of the Republic, under the ticket of General Manuel A. Odría, who handily won the elections, as he did not have any opposition. Simultaneously, He was elected senator for Lima (1950–1956). He chaired the Senate in 1950–1951 and 1954–1956.

During Manuel Prado Ugarteche's second government, he was appointed ambassador to France (1956–1962).

Bibliography 
 Tauro del Pino, Alberto: Enciclopedia Ilustrada del Perú. Third Edition. Volume 3, BEI/CAN. Lima, PEISA, 2001. 
 Portal del Congreso del Perú: Presidente del Senado / Héctor Boza. 
 El Mariscal Benavides, su vida y su obra. Lima, Editorial Atlántida, 2 volúmenes. 1976, 1981.

Vice presidents of Peru
Presidents of the Senate of Peru
1888 births
1974 deaths
People from Lima
Missouri University of Science and Technology alumni